José Tomás Toro (born 11 November 1970) is a Spanish judoka. He competed in the men's half-lightweight event at the 1996 Summer Olympics.

Achievements

References

External links

1970 births
Living people
Spanish male judoka
Olympic judoka of Spain
Judoka at the 1996 Summer Olympics
20th-century Spanish people